Pseudoscilla is a genus of sea snails, marine gastropod mollusks in the family Pyramidellidae, the pyrams and their allies.

Species
Species within the genus Pseudoscilla include:
 Pseudoscilla babylonia (C. B. Adams, 1845)
 Pseudoscilla bilirata (de Folin, 1870)
 Pseudoscilla pauciemersa Peñas & Rolán, 1999
 Pseudoscilla saotomensis Penas & Rolan, 1999
 Pseudoscilla verdensis Peñas & Rolán, 1999
Species placed in synonymy
 Pseudoscilla decorata (Folin, 1873): synonym of Liamorpha decorata (de Folin, 1873)

References

External links
 To World Register of Marine Species

Pyramidellidae